Rodney S. Scott served as the 24th Chief of the United States Border Patrol from January 24, 2020 to August 14, 2021 in both the Trump and Biden administrations.

Career

Scott joined the Border Patrol in 1992, and has served in various leadership positions within the Border Patrol and U.S. Customs and Border Protection (CBP), including the El Centro Sector's chief patrol agent; the San Diego Sector's deputy chief patrol agent; patrol agent in charge at the San Diego Sector's Brown Field Station; assistant chief in CBP's Office of Anti-Terrorism in Washington, D.C.; and division chief and director for the Incident Management and Operations Coordination Division at CBP Headquarters.

As Chief, Scott supported President Trump's border wall, and was critical of Democrats who favored other ways of addressing illegal aliens. Scott refused to support President Biden's directive to stop using legal words like "illegal alien" in favor of descriptors like "migrant".  Between March 2021 and May 2021, a record number of unaccompanied children were picked up along the border, which forced many to be placed in shelters after federal border facilities were overwhelmed.  In June 2021, Scott released a statement saying he had been "given the option to resign, retire or relocate with no rationale provided...so the new administration can place the person they want in the position".  Deputy Chief Raul Ortiz will serve as interim chief.

Personal life
Scott is married and has two daughters. He grew up in rural areas of Indiana and Arizona.  Scott lived in Coronado, California from 1994 to 1997, before moving to Arizona and Washington, D.C. for job assignments. In 2008, Scott and his family moved back to Coronado.

References

Living people
United States Border Patrol agents
U.S. Immigration and Customs Enforcement officials
People from Coronado, California
Trump administration personnel
Biden administration personnel
Year of birth missing (living people)
Place of birth missing (living people)